Frowds Almshouses are grade II* listed almshouses at 1-12 Bedwin Street in Salisbury, Wiltshire, England.

References

External links

Georgian architecture in Wiltshire
Grade II* listed buildings in Wiltshire
Grade II* listed houses
Buildings and structures in Salisbury
Almshouses in Wiltshire